Rita's Franchise Company, LLC, doing business as Rita's Italian Ice (informally known as "Rita's Water Ice"), is a privately owned and operated American quick service restaurant chain that operates primarily in the Mid-Atlantic United States. The chain is known for its Italian ice and  frozen custard, but also offers multiple types of frozen treats and specialty creations. Rita's opened its first restaurant in 1984 in Bensalem, Pennsylvania, where the chain is currently headquartered. , the chain had 538 restaurants in 31 states, mostly located in the Mid-Atlantic.

History
Rita's was founded in May 1984 by former Philadelphia firefighter Bob Tumolo with a recipe that he purchased from an elderly neighbor that he then adjusted to enhance the flavors and include real fruit. Tumolo named the restaurant after his wife, Rita Tumolo. Rita's originally advertised its product as "water ice", using the regional term for what is sometimes called "Italian ice" in other areas of the country. By 1987 a second store was opened, and in 1989 the family decided to franchise their business. Today, there are over 600 locations in 30 states and the District of Columbia that serve 45000 people daily. In May 2005, the company was sold to McKnight Capital Partners, a private equity group with extensive franchise experience. McKnight Capital Partners recognized the organization's growth potential and set into place plans to expand the company.

In April 2007, Rita's moved its Bensalem headquarters to the Trevose section of Bensalem Township.

In 2011, Falconhead Capital purchased a controlling interest in the company from an investment group led by Jim Rudolph. Falconhead named their operating partner Thomas Christopoul as the new chairman and interim chief executive.

In 2013, Rita's opened its first location outside of the United States in Shenzhen, China.

Rita's has traditionally given out a free regular-sized Italian ice on the first day of Spring from 1984 to 2019, and since 2022. Rita's did not do a first day of Spring in 2020–21, due to the COVID-19 pandemic.

In January 2017, Argosy Private Equity and MTN Capital acquired controlling stake in Rita's from Falconhead Capital.

Products 
 All-natural Italian ice, trans-fat-free and gluten free (Strawberry, Pineapple, Banana, Coconut, Cranberry, Cranberry-Pineapple, Cranberry-Strawberry, Orange-Pineapple, Pineapple-coconut, Strawberry-Banana and Strawberry-Pineapple)
 Blendini, a combination of frozen custard and water ice blended with a topping
 Concrete, a combination of frozen custard with a topping
 Cream Ice (Mint Chocolate-Chip, Birthday Cake, Cookie Dough, Coconut, S'mores, Blackberry-Cheesecake)
 Frozen Drink, a drink of water and water ice
 Gelati, water ice in between frozen custard
 Ice Flight, four ice flavors in a small tray
 Milkshakes (Oreo Cookies & Cream, Oreo Chocolate, Peanut Butter, Strawberry Short-Cake, Chocolate Covered Strawberry, Chocolate Heath, Chocolate/Vanilla/Strawberry)
 Misto, a drink of liquid custard blended with water ice
 Sidekick Sundae, frozen custard with hot fudge, chocolate chips, a brownie, whipped cream, and a cherry
 Slenderita, fat-free soft serve

Partnerships
In 2010, Rita's Italian Ice began a partnership with Just Born to offer a seasonal Peeps Brand Marshmallow Candy flavored ice. The Peeps flavor was discontinued in 2011, but was offered in some stores in spring 2017.

Rita's partnered with Cadbury in July 2009 to introduce its Swedish Fish Italian ice flavor. On June 29, 2012, Rita's partnered with Cadbury again to release its Sour Patch Kids Red water ice flavor.

Other companies involved in Rita's water ice flavors include Alex's Lemonade Stand ("Alex's Lemonade" water ice) and Nabisco ("Oreo Cookies and Cream" cream ice and "Mint Oreo" cream ice).

See also

 List of frozen custard companies

References

External links

Fast-food chains of the United States
Fast-food franchises
Frozen custard
Cuisine of Philadelphia
Companies based in Philadelphia
Private equity portfolio companies
American companies established in 1984
Restaurants established in 1984
Ice cream parlors in the United States
1984 establishments in Pennsylvania